Sajik Tampak is a small village situated in Chandel district of Manipur, India.

It is located in Chakpikarong sub district of Chandel district in the state Manipur.

Demographics 
The village has population about 1562 people, among them 1171  are males and 391 are females. The village has 171 households and 9 persons live in every family.

Literacy 
A total of 1235 people are literate in the village Sajik Tampak. Only 1022 are males and 213 are females.

References 

Villages in Chandel district